Rissoina erythraea is a species of minute sea snail, a marine gastropod mollusk or micromollusk in the family Rissoinidae.

This is a nomen dubium.

Description

Distribution
This species occurs in the Red Sea and in the Indian Ocean off Madagascar.

References

 Dautzenberg, Ph. (1929). Mollusques testacés marins de Madagascar. Faune des Colonies Francaises, Tome III
 Sleurs W.J.M. (1993) A revision of the Recent species of Rissoina (Moerchiella), R. (Apataxia), R. (Ailinzebina) and R. (Pachyrissoina) (Gastropoda: Rissoidae). Bull. K. Belg. Inst. Nat. Wet. 63: 71-135

Rissoinidae